Bill Meyer (born 4 November 1958) is a Canadian former water polo player. Meyer was a member of the Canadian water polo team at the 1984 Summer Olympics.

According to Carleton University student newspaper The Charlatan, Meyer was a coach for Carleton water polo teams in the 1990s, but came out of retirement to complete his degree and play games for the Ravens in 2014.

Highlights

References

1958 births
Living people
Canadian male water polo players
Carleton University alumni
Olympic water polo players of Canada
Water polo players at the 1984 Summer Olympics
Place of birth missing (living people)